The Tajikistan men's national volleyball team represents Tajikistan in international volleyball competitions and friendly matches.

Before independence, Tajik-born volleyballers represented Soviet Union, one notable player was Valeri Kravchenko.

Tajikistan is yet to participate in any major tournaments. However the team do play friendly matches, back in 2014 they played a series versus Afghanistan.

References

Volleyball
National men's volleyball teams
Volleyball in Tajikistan
Men's sport in Tajikistan